Pristimantis huicundo is a species of frog in the family Strabomantidae.

It is found in Ecuador and possibly Colombia.
Its natural habitats are tropical moist montane forests and high-altitude grassland.
It is threatened by habitat loss.

References

huicundo
Endemic fauna of Ecuador
Amphibians of Ecuador
Amphibians of the Andes
Frogs of South America
Amphibians described in 2004
Taxonomy articles created by Polbot